Hemilepidotus, the Irish lords, is a genus of ray-finned fishes belonging to the family Agonidae, the poachers and sea ravens. These fishes are found in northern Pacific, northern Atlantic and the Arctic Oceans.

Species
There are currently six recognized species in this genus:
 Hemilepidotus gilberti D. S. Jordan & Starks, 1904 (Gilbert's Irish lord)
 Hemilepidotus hemilepidotus (Tilesius, 1811) (Red Irish lord)
 Hemilepidotus jordani T. H. Bean, 1881 (Yellow Irish lord)
 Hemilepidotus papilio (T. H. Bean, 1880) (Butterfly sculpin)
 Hemilepidotus spinosus Ayres, 1854 (Brown Irish lord)
 Hemilepidotus zapus C. H. Gilbert & Burke, 1912 (Longfin Irish lord)

References

 
Agonidae
Marine fish genera
 
Taxa named by Georges Cuvier